Galsangiin Byambaa (born 1 May 1938) is a Mongolian archer. He competed in the men's individual event at the 1972 Summer Olympics.

References

External links
 

1938 births
Living people
Mongolian male archers
Olympic archers of Mongolia
Archers at the 1972 Summer Olympics
Place of birth missing (living people)